Dr John Arnold Lovern FRIC FRSE OBE (b.1905) was a Scottish marine biologist and scientific writer.

Life

He was born in England on 27 May 1906. He studied Science at Liverpool University and continued as a postgraduate, gaining both a PhD and DSc. He became Director of the Torry Marine Research Station near Aberdeen.

In 1960 he was elected a Fellow of the Royal Society of Edinburgh. His proposers were William Ogilvy Kermack, George Adam Reay, David Cuthbertson, and James Robert Matthews. Lovern resigned in 1970.

Publications

Fat Metabolism in Fishes
Variation in the Chemical Composition of Herring (1938) with Dr Henry Wood
The Chemistry of Lipids'' (1955)

References

1905 births
Alumni of the University of Liverpool
British marine biologists
Fellows of the Royal Society of Edinburgh
Year of death missing